Anna Kristina Cecilia Blomberg (born 20 May 1972 in Gothenburg) is a Swedish actress and comedian. She has appeared in many TV series, among them Häxan Surtant, Kvarteret Skatan (her breakthrough role), and Superhjältejul. In addition, she performs on the stage and radio. In 2009 she participated in SVT's julkalender (Christmas Calendar).

References

External links
 
 
 Official website

Swedish television actresses
Living people
1972 births
Actors from Gothenburg
20th-century Swedish actresses